Jean de Créquy was born in 1395 into the military Créquy family, dating back to the 10th century, the son of Jean IV (1366–1411) and Jeanne de Roye (1375–1434).

He became seigneur (lord of the manor) of Créquy, Canaples and Fressin on the death of his father and was one of the first ‘Knights of the Golden Fleece’, an order started by Philip the Good, Duke of Burgundy.
He saw action throughout the Hundred Years War, on either side of the conflict. Jean V was in the service of Philip, Duke of Burgundy (whose allegiances changed twice) and took part in the defence of Paris against Joan of Arc in 1429 and became French ambassador to Aragon. 

In 1456, he married Louise de La Tour d'Auvergne (died 1469), the daughter of Bertrand de La Tour d'Auvergne and Jacquette du Peschin.
They had two children: Jacqueline (1457–1509) and Jean (1458–1480).

Jean de Crequy died in 1474.

See also 

 Créquy family
 List of Knights of the Golden Fleece

1474 deaths
1395 births
Jean
Knights of the Golden Fleece
Burgundian knights